Basil Harry Losten (born May 11, 1930) is a bishop of the Ukrainian Greek Catholic Church. He is currently Bishop Emeritus of the Ukrainian Catholic Diocese of Stamford, Connecticut. He was succeeded by Bishop Paul Patrick Chomnycky.

Education 
Losten was born  in Chesapeake City, Maryland.  He attended St. Basil School in Philadelphia and went on to attend the Ukrainian Catholic Seminary, Stamford, Connecticut.  He graduated from St. Basil College with a bachelor of arts in philosophy.  In 1957, he completed his graduate work in theology at the Catholic University of America.

Priesthood 
On June 10, 1957, Losten was ordained to the priesthood by Bishop Constantine Bohachevsky.  His first assignment included work as chancery secretary for the Philadelphia Archdiocese as well as working in several Philadelphia parishes. In 1962, he was named personal secretary to Archbishop-Metropolitan Ambrose Senyshyn.  This position led him to various posts within the eparchy, including comptroller and consultor, president of Ascension Manor (a senior citizens complex—a project he initiated), director of the Archdiocesan Insurance Commission, and a member of the Archdiocesan Building Commission.

In 1968, Pope Paul VI raised him to the rank of papal chamberlain.  He was nominated to the episcopacy on March 23, 1971, and was consecrated on May 25, 1971.  He was named auxiliary to the Ukrainian Archdiocese of Philadelphia and in 1976, during Senyshyn’s failing health, Pope Paul VI appointed Losten apostolic administrator in charge of diocesan affairs. In September 1977, Losten was named Bishop of Stamford, succeeding Joseph M. Schmondiuk. The diocese comprises New York State and all of the New England states.  He retired on January 3, 2006, and was succeeded by Paul Chomnycky.

See also
 

 Catholic Church hierarchy
 Catholic Church in the United States
 Historical list of the Catholic bishops of the United States
 List of Catholic bishops of the United States
 Lists of patriarchs, archbishops, and bishops

References

Sources
Jaksic, Vesna, "A new leader: Bishop installed as head of Ukrainian Catholics in area", The Advocate of Stamford, Connecticut, February 21, 2006
Ukrainian Weekly, "Bishop Losten appointed emissary for Church development in Ukraine", July 1, 1990
"Bishop Emeritus Basil Losten, builder of the Church in the U.S. and Ukraine", Ukrainian Weekly online 2006

External links
Ukrainian Catholic Eparchy of Stamford Official Site
Diocese of Stamford, Connecticut

Episcopal succession

1930 births
Living people
Bishops of the Ukrainian Greek Catholic Church
People from Chesapeake City, Maryland
Catholic University of America alumni
Bishops in Connecticut
American Eastern Catholic bishops